Lilienfeld may refer to:

 Lilienfeld, a city in Lower Austria
 Lilienfeld Abbey, a Cistercian monastery in Lilienfeld, Austria
 Abraham Lilienfeld, American epidemiologist
 Julius Edgar Lilienfeld, German-American engineer and inventor
 Paul von Lilienfeld, Russian statesman and social scientist
 Robert Lilienfeld, American author
 Scott Lilienfeld, American author, professor, Psychologist